Umhlanga lagoon is a  nature reserve on the shore of the Indian Ocean at Umhlanga Rocks, South Africa. The reserve encloses the Ohlanga River's lagoon and mouth. The forest forms a natural extension of the less accessible Hawaan Forest, of which the greater part lies inland of the busy M4 road. The reserve trails start at a car park at the northern end of Lagoon Drive, Umhlanga.

The reserve has picnic sites, the remains of a prehistoric shell midden and walking trails, with a walkway and pedestrian bridge that span the lagoon.

At the mouth of the Ohlanga lagoon there is a popular but unofficial nudist beach. Increased use of the area by non-nudist walkers and families resulted in complaints about nudism and antisocial behaviour. The area was at one time a ‘no-go’ area, due to a serious crime problem.

See also

Notes and references 

 
 

Nude beaches
Beaches of South Africa
Tourist attractions in Durban
Protected areas of KwaZulu-Natal